Xiangzhou District (literally: "Fragrant Islet") is a district of Zhuhai, Guangdong province. It is located at the southwest corner of the Pearl River Delta, bordering Macau to the south and southeast. The district is the political, financial, transit, and cultural center of Zhuhai.

Administration
The district is divided in 9 subdistricts and 6 towns.

Education

Zhuhai Girls' Middle School, a private girls' junior-senior high school, is in Xiangzhou District.

QSI International School of Zhuhai is in Wanzi Subdistrict, Xiangzhou District. QSI Zhuhai previously was in Building 2B, Hengxin Industry District, Gongbei Subdistrict, Xiangzhou District. It was later on the campus of Zhuhai Girls' Middle School in Xiangzhou District.

The Zhuhai Japanese Saturday School, a supplementary Japanese school, holds classes at QSI Zhuhai.

References

County-level divisions of Guangdong
Zhuhai